Mozambique Island Bridge is a bridge in Mozambique that connects the Island of Mozambique, the former capital of colonial Portuguese East Africa to the mainland over the Indian Ocean.

History
In 1962, the government of Mozambique launched a tender for the construction of a 3,390 meter bridge to connect the Island of Mozambique to the mainland.

In July 2004, a construction to rehabilitate the bridge started with a $9-million budget.

A lighting system was installed on the bridge in 2013.

Description
The western end of the bridge is on the mainland in Lumbo.

The Mozambique Island Bridge is a one-way, one-lane concrete bridge.

See also
List of longest bridges in the world

References

Bridges in Mozambique
Buildings and structures in Nampula Province